Maurizio Montesi (born September 19, 1952) is a retired Italian gymnast. He competed at the 1976 Olympics in all artistic gymnastics events with the best result of 29th place on the rings.

References

1952 births
Living people
People from Forlì
Gymnasts at the 1976 Summer Olympics
Olympic gymnasts of Italy
Italian male artistic gymnasts
Sportspeople from the Province of Forlì-Cesena